A Force More Powerful is a 1999 feature-length documentary film and a 2000 PBS  series written and directed by Steve York about nonviolent resistance movements around the world. Executive producers were Dalton Delan and Jack DuVall. Peter Ackerman was the series editor and principal content advisor.

Institutional support for the film included funding from the United States Institute of Peace and the Albert Einstein Institution.

The film played in festivals worldwide and was broadcast nationally on United States television network PBS in September 2000. It was nominated for an Emmy Award for Outstanding Historical Program.

The series explores six successful nonviolent movements in the 20th century, including Mohandas Gandhi's leadership of the Indian Independence movement, the Civil Rights Movement, the boycotts in the Eastern Cape Province as part of the Anti-Apartheid movement in South Africa, the Danish resistance to Nazi Occupation, the Polish Solidarity Movement, and the Chilean democracy movement to oust Augusto Pinochet.

A Force More Powerful is also the name of the companion book to the PBS series, authored by DuVall and Peter Ackerman,.  In the Acknowledgments section of the book, the authors name Steve York as their most-cited source. The book was published with Palgrave Macmillan and has been recognized as an important resource for peace education.

In 2006, the team behind the film, TV series and book released a nonviolent video game developed by Breakaway Games with the same title. The video game was designed to teach the waging of conflict using nonviolent methods. Ivan Marović, one of the leaders of the Serbian student movement called Otpor!, was one of the designers. A turn-based strategy game, it consists of ten pre-built scenarios and an editing system that will allow players to create scenarios of their own. The game's budget was $3 million.

See also
 List of American films of 1999
 Civil rights movement in popular culture
 Erica Chenoweth

References

External links
 The Film's homepage
 The Game's homepage
Emmy Award Nominees for the Year 2000

 Review of A Force More Powerful on Gamasutra
 Information about AFMP game on Games For Change
 
 

1999 films
American documentary films
Government simulation video games
Nonviolent resistance movements
Films directed by Steve York
2000s American documentary television series
PBS original programming
Civil rights movement in television
1990s English-language films
1990s American films